Hollywood is a RNA splicing database containing data for the splicing of orthologous genes in different species.

See also
 Alternative splicing
 EDAS
 AspicDB

References

External links
 http://hollywood.mit.edu

Genetics databases
Gene expression
Spliceosome
RNA splicing